Pétur Úlfar Ormslev (born 28 July 1958 in Iceland) is a retired football midfielder.

Career

During his club career, Ormslev mainly played for Fram Reykjavík, with three seasons at Fortuna Düsseldorf.

He also amassed 41 caps for the Iceland national team, scoring five goals.

At the end of his career, he acted as manager of Fram.

References

External links
 

1958 births
Living people
Petur Ormslev
Petur Ormslev
Association football midfielders
Petur Ormslev
Fortuna Düsseldorf players
Bundesliga players
Petur Ormslev
Expatriate footballers in Germany
Icelandic expatriate sportspeople in Germany
Petur Ormslev
Petur Ormslev
Petur Ormslev
Petur Ormslev
Petur Ormslev